Rock the House is the debut album from the hip hop duo DJ Jazzy Jeff & The Fresh Prince. The album was released on April 7, 1987 in Europe and the United States, and was subsequently re-issued in 1988 in Europe and the United Kingdom. Three tracks from the album were released as singles: "The Magnificent Jazzy Jeff", "A Touch of Jazz" and "Girls Ain't Nothing But Trouble". When the album was released on CD in 1988, the rerecorded version of "Girls Ain't Nothing But Trouble", which was released as a single after He's the DJ, I'm the Rapper ran its course, replaced the original 1986 recording.The art work for the Album cover was done by a local Philadelphia Artist Charles Gossett.

Track listing

Samples
Sample credits
"Girls Ain't Nothing but Trouble" 
 Theme from I Dream of Jeannie (1985 recording for Television's Greatest Hits: 65 TV Themes! From the 50's and 60's)
 "Catch the Beat" by T-Ski Valley
"Just One of Those Days"
 "Puttin' on the Ritz" by Taco
 "Change the Beat (Female Version)" by Beside
"Rock the House"
 "Ben" by Michael Jackson
 Theme From Sanford and Son
 "Theme from Mahogany (Do You Know Where You're Going To)" by Diana Ross
 "The Big Beat" by Billy Squier
"Takin' It to the Top"
 "Cold Sweat" by James Brown
 "Kool Is Back" by Funk, Inc.
"The Magnificent Jazzy Jeff"
 "Good Times" by Chic
 "Change the Beat (Female Version)" by Beside
 "Def Jam" by Jazzy Jay
 "Get Fly" by T.J. Swann & Company
 "Kool Is Back" by Funk, Inc.
 "Dance to the Drummer's Beat" by Herman Kelly and Life
 "Here We Go" by Run-DMC
 "Punk Rock Rap" by The Cold Crush Brothers
 "Roxanne's Revenge" by Roxanne Shante
 State of the Union speech by Ronald Reagan
 "Girls Ain't Nothing But Trouble" by DJ Jazzy Jeff & the Fresh Prince
 "Death Mix (Part II)" by Afrika Bambaataa
 "The Saga of Roxanne ('It's Fresh')" by Korner Boyz
 "19" by Paul Hardcastle
 "(Nothing Serious) Just Buggin'" by Whistle
 "Funky Drummer" by James Brown
 "The Big Beat" by Billy Squier
 "Shout" by Tears for Fears
"Just Rockin'"
 "Reading the Comics - July, 1945" by Fiorello La Guardia
 "Change the Beat" (Female Version) by Beside 
 "Rocket In The Pocket (Live)" by Cerrone
"Guys Ain't Nothing But Trouble"
 Theme From I Dream of Jeannie
"A Touch of Jazz"
 "Westchester Lady" by Bob James 
 "'T' Plays It Cool" by Marvin Gaye 
 "Harlem River Drive" by Bobbi Humphrey
 "Mr. Magic" by Grover Washington Jr.
 "Change (Makes You Want to Hustle)" by Donald Byrd

Charts

Weekly charts

Certifications

References

1987 debut albums
DJ Jazzy Jeff & The Fresh Prince albums
Jive Records albums